Nantwich Town Council is the town council for the Cheshire market town of Nantwich. It was established in 1974 as a successor council to the Nantwich Urban District Council. The last elections were held in May 2015 which saw the Conservative Party win 8 of the 12 seats. The Council is split into two wards, Nantwich North and West (5) and Nantwich South (7). It primarily raises funds through a precept on Council Tax and has the highest Band D in Cheshire East.

Powers and functions
The Town Council derives the bulk of its powers from the Local Government Act 1972 and subsequent legislation. The Town Council operates four Allotment sites, public toilets, Civic Hall,  Tourist Information Centre and the Market Hall.

References

Town Councils in Cheshire
Local precepting authorities in England
Town Council